Turtay is a local state-owned farm of Akto County in Xinjiang Uygur Autonomous Region, China. The farm is located in the northeast of Akto County and 8 kilometers away northeast of Akto Town. It covers an area of 43 square kilometers with 1,238 households and a population of 4,768 (as of 2015). The farm is divided into 8 production teams and quartered in Turtay Village of Jamaterek Township.

The name of Turtay is from Uighur language, meaning "date red foal". The farm was formed in 1958 as the 2nd branch of Hongqi Farm of Kizilsu Kyrgyz Autonomous Prefecture and transferred to Akto County under its administration in 1973, it was renamed to the present name in 1981.

References 

Township-level divisions of Akto County